Van Buren Township is one of fourteen townships in Shelby County, Indiana. As of the 2010 census, its population was 1,480 and it contained 622 housing units.

The township was named for Martin Van Buren, the eighth President of the United States.

Geography

Unincorporated towns
 Fountaintown

References

External links
 Indiana Township Association
 United Township Association of Indiana

Townships in Shelby County, Indiana
Townships in Indiana